Eugen Albrecht (21 June 1872, in Sonthofen – 18 June 1908, in Frankfurt am Main) was a German pathologist. His research largely dealt with the physical-chemical status of cells under normal and pathological conditions.

In 1895 he obtained his doctorate from the University of Munich, where he was a student of Karl Wilhelm von Kupffer. Afterwards, he was an assistant to Wilhelm Roux at the institute of anatomy in Halle, followed by work at the Stazione Zoologica Anton Dohrn in Naples (1897–98). In 1899 he became an assistant to Otto Bollinger at the institute of pathology in Munich. From 1900 to 1904, he served as prosector at the Städtisches Krankenhaus rechts der Isar. In 1904, he succeeded Karl Weigert as director of the Senckenberg Institute of Pathological Anatomy in Frankfurt. He died four years later of a pulmonary hemorrhage caused by tuberculosis.

He is remembered for development of the concept of "hamartoma and choristoma" in an attempt to describe the relationship between abnormal formation and tumor. In 1907 he founded the journal Frankfurter Zeitschrift für Pathologie.

Published works 
 Vorfragen der Biologie, 1899 - Preliminary issues of biology.
 Struktur der Leberzelle, 1899 - Structure of the liver cell.
 Zur Frage der Coagulations nekrose (with Hans Schmaus), 1899 - On coagulative necrosis.
 Gegen die Teleologie, 1899 - About teleology.
 Pathologie der Zelle, 1902 - Pathology of the cell.
 Über das Cavernom der Milz, 1902 - On cavernoma of the spleen.
 Experimentelle Untersuchungen über die Kernmembran, 1903 - Experimental investigations on the nuclear membrane.
 Beiträge zur pathologischen Anatomie (with Otto Bollinger), 1903 - Contribution to pathological anatomy.

References 

1872 births
1908 deaths
People from Sonthofen
People from the Kingdom of Bavaria
German pathologists
Ludwig Maximilian University of Munich alumni